Ypsolopha sublucella is a moth of the family Ypsolophidae. It is known from California, United States.

The larvae feed on oaks of the section Protobalanus (intermediate oaks), including Quercus vaccinifolia.

References

Ypsolophidae
Endemic fauna of California
Moths of North America
Fauna of the California chaparral and woodlands
Fauna of the Sierra Nevada (United States)
Fauna without expected TNC conservation status